Dąbrówka Wisłocka  is a village in the administrative district of Gmina Radomyśl Wielki, within Mielec County, Subcarpathian Voivodeship, in south-eastern Poland.

The village has a population of 750.

References

Villages in Mielec County